Spilarctia tengchongensis is a moth in the family Erebidae. It was described by Cheng-Lai Fang and Wencong Cao in 1984. It is found in Yunnan, China.

References

Moths described in 1984
tengchongensis